The Lazarev Ice Shelf is that part of the ice shelf fringing the Princess Astrid Coast of Queen Maud Land, Antarctica, that lies between Leningradskiy Island and Verblyud Island. The ice shelf was first photographed from the air and mapped by the Third German Antarctic Expedition, 1938–39. It was explored and mapped by the Soviet Antarctic Expedition in 1959, and named for Lieutenant (later Admiral) Mikhail P. Lazarev, commander of the sloop Mirnyy.

It was named Mys Opornyy (support point) because the ice shelf at this point rests on the ocean floor.

See also
Cape Murmanskiy
Uragannyy Point

References

Ice shelves of Queen Maud Land
Princess Astrid Coast
Lazarev Sea